Heteroclinus perspicillatus, the common weedfish, is a species of clinid native to southern Australia where it is found in seagrass beds and rocky reefs (especially with kelp cover) at depths of up to  .  This species can reach a maximum length of  TL.

The common weedfish is ovoviviparous, meaning young develop inside eggs and hatch within the female, before the well-developed larvae are born alive.

References

perspicillatus
Taxa named by Achille Valenciennes
Fish described in 1836